George Elliott "Eck" Allen (December 31, 1911 – September 2, 1997) was an American football player and coach of football and basketball.  He served as the head football coach at the University of Maine in 1941 and from 1946 to 1948, tallying a mark of 15–11–2.  Allen was also the head basketball coach at Brown University from 1938 to 1941 and at Maine from 1945 to 1949, compiling a career college basketball record of 73–53.

Early life and playing career
Allen was born in Oldtown, Kentucky and attended high school in Ashland.  He played football at the West Virginia University from 1932 to 1934.

Later life and death
After retiring from coaching, Allen worked as a salesman of materials used in steel production.  He died on September 2, 1997 at the age of 85 after a long illness.  He was a resident of Kissimmee, Florida at the time of his death.

Head coaching record

College football

College basketball

See also
 List of college football head coaches with non-consecutive tenure

References

External links
 

1911 births
1997 deaths
People from Greenup County, Kentucky
Sportspeople from Ashland, Kentucky
Players of American football from Kentucky
American football quarterbacks
West Virginia Mountaineers football players
Coaches of American football from Kentucky
High school football coaches in West Virginia
Brown Bears football coaches
Maine Black Bears football coaches
Fordham Rams football coaches
Basketball coaches from Kentucky
American men's basketball coaches
High school basketball coaches in West Virginia
Brown Bears men's basketball coaches
Maine Black Bears men's basketball coaches
College men's basketball head coaches in the United States